A time zone is a region of the Earth that has adopted the same standard time.  

Time zone can also refer to:
Time Zone (band), experimental hip-hop group headed by Afrika Bambaataa
Time Zones (album), a 1977 album by Richard Teitelbaum Anthony Braxton 
Time Zone (video game), historical video game
Timezone (video arcades), a chain of video arcade centers based in Australia
"Time Zones" (Mad Men), S7/E1 of Mad Men